Lucien Leduc (30 December 1918 – 17 July 2004) was a French football midfielder and a manager.

Honours

As a player
CO Roubaix-Tourcoing
 French championship: 1947

RC Paris
 Coupe de France: 1949

As a coach
Marseille
 French championship: 1971

Monaco
 French championship: 1961, 1963, 1978
 Division 2: 1977
 Coupe de France: 1960, 1963

Servette
 Swiss Super League runner-up: 1966
 Swiss Cup runner-up: 1965, 1966

External links
 
 

1918 births
2004 deaths
French footballers
France international footballers
French expatriate footballers
Association football midfielders
US Boulogne players
Montpellier HSC players
FC Sète 34 players
Clermont Foot players
Red Star F.C. players
Racing Club de France Football players
Venezia F.C. players
AS Saint-Étienne players
Ligue 1 players
FC Annecy players
Serie A players
Expatriate footballers in Italy
French football managers
Venezia F.C. managers
AS Monaco FC managers
Servette FC managers
Angers SCO managers
Olympique de Marseille managers
Stade de Reims managers
Paris Saint-Germain F.C. managers
FC Annecy managers
Excelsior AC (France) players
Algeria national football team managers
Expatriate football managers in Morocco
Wydad AC managers
Expatriate football managers in Belgium
Standard Liège managers
CO Roubaix-Tourcoing players
1968 African Cup of Nations managers
Botola managers